David Blue (born January 17, 1982) is an American actor, writer, producer and director. He is known for his portrayal of Cliff St. Paul on Ugly Betty, Eli Wallace on the Syfy series Stargate Universe, and Rick Twitler on both Nickelodeon's Henry Danger and Danger Force.

Early life 
The youngest of three boys, Blue was raised in both New York and Florida. Blue attended Countryside High School in Clearwater, Florida, He graduated from the University of Central Florida in Orlando with a Bachelor of Fine Arts in Acting and Musical Theatre Performance.

Career 
His first starring role came in the film Winter Follies, directed by Darren Lynn Bousman who also helmed Saw II, Saw III, and Saw IV.

David was one of the eight selected for the Apprentice program at the Actor's Theatre of Louisville, where he worked with many acclaimed artists, such as Jennifer Hubbard and Sullivan Canaday White. He was also later granted a scholarship to the British Academy of Dramatic Arts but his burgeoning career prevented him from accepting straight away. He has training in many different acting styles including Method, Meisner, Viewpoints, and Suzuki. David has also had extensive improvisation training and comedy experience.

Blue performed in the premiere workshop production of Ain't No Mountain High Enough at the Mark Taper Forum. The musical was based on the works of Motown creator Berry Gordy and directed by Kenny Leon who had previously directed Sean Combs in the Broadway production of A Raisin in the Sun. The musical co-starred such TV/Film/Theatre talent as Cleavant Derricks and Ellis Williams.

On Ugly Betty, Blue starred as Cliff St. Paul, a photographer at Mode magazine and love interest to Wilhelmina Slater's faithful assistant, Marc St. James, played by Michael Urie. Before his breakthrough role on Ugly Betty, David was busy making guest appearances elsewhere, including Veronica Mars, FX's series Dirt, and Disney's hit comedy The Suite Life of Zack & Cody. Blue received a large following on CBS's Moonlight as Logan Griffen, a technology-obsessed vampire recluse who often assists Mick St. John, played by Alex O'Loughlin. CBS chose to not renew Moonlight after its first season. One of Blue's feature film appearances was in The Comebacks, a comedy spoof on inspirational sports movies starring David Koechner, Matthew Lawrence, and Bradley Cooper.

Blue was part of the one-night celebrity staging of Howard Ashman's unproduced musical Dreamstuff. The musical was re-imagined by Howard's partners Marsha Malamet and Dennis Green and performed one night only at Los Angeles' Hayworth Theatre as part of the Bruno Kirby celebrity reading series, directed by his Ugly Betty co-star Michael Urie. David starred in the show alongside Eden Espinosa, Fred Willard, Vicki Lewis, and Luke Macfarlane.

Currently producing/writing multiple projects, David was seen as one of the leads on Syfy's Stargate Universe. Starring opposite Robert Carlyle, David played the role of Eli Wallace.

David had a podcast channel called Out of the Blue where he interviews famous actors such as Torri Higginson, Claudia Black, Robert Picardo and Chase Masterson can be accessed on his Patreon page.

David has been seen in a television commercial for the fast food chain DQ.

Filmography

Film

Television and video games

References

External links 

 
 

1982 births
Male actors from New York (state)
American male film actors
American film directors
American male television actors
Living people
People from Long Island
University of Central Florida alumni